Humphrey Primatt (1734 – ) was an English clergyman and animal rights writer. Primatt has been described as "one of the most important figures in the development of a notion of animal rights."

Biography

Primatt was born in London, in 1734. He obtained a BA in 1757 and MA in 1764 from Clare College, Cambridge. He was a Church of England clergyman. He was vicar of Higham (1766-1774) and rector of Brampton (1771–1774). Primatt obtained a Doctor of Divinity from Marischal College, in 1773. He married a Miss Gulliver on 2 October 1769 and retired in 1771 to Kingston upon Thames.

Animal rights

In 1776, Primatt authored A Dissertation on the Duty of Mercy and Sin of Cruelty to Brute Animals, which argued that all animals were created by God, so deserve humane treatment and that any form of cruelty to animals should be equated with atheism and wickedness.

Primatt held that pain is evil and humans have no right to inflict it on animals or each other. He commented that "pain is pain, whether it be inflicted on man or on beast". It was one of the first books to argue for the compassionate treatment of animals and influenced the animal welfare movement.

The Royal Society for the Prevention of Cruelty to Animals considers the book a "foundation stone" of their organization as it influenced the founders of their society. Arthur Broome was inspired by Primatt's book and republished it in 1822. Henry Stephens Salt described it as a "quaint but excellent book". Marc Bekoff has noted that "Primatt was largely responsible for bringing animal welfare to the attention of the general public."

Primatt did not promote vegetarianism. He suggested that man is permitted to kill animals for food but denied that this permits unnecessary suffering.

Selected publications

A Dissertation on the Duty of Mercy and Sin of Cruelty to Brute Animals (1776)

See also

James Granger
John Hildrop

References

1734 births
1770s deaths
18th-century English Anglican priests
Alumni of Clare College, Cambridge
Clergy from London
Doctors of Divinity
English animal rights scholars
Writers from London